The men's discus throw event at the 2006 African Championships in Athletics was held at the Stade Germain Comarmond on August 10.

Results

Note: Nabil Kiram of Morocco originally finished in the bronze medal position with 53.41 metres but was later disqualified for doping.

References
Results 
Results

2006 African Championships in Athletics
Discus throw at the African Championships in Athletics